The 1965–66 Maltese First Division was the 51st season of top-tier football in Malta.

The season started on 16th October 1965 and ended on 23rd February 1966. It was entirely played on Manoel Island football ground.

It was contested by 6 teams, and Sliema Wanderers F.C. won the championship for the 18th time, the third in a row.

League standings

Results

References

External links
Malta - List of final tables (RSSSF)

Maltese Premier League seasons
1965–66 in European association football leagues 
Premier